Hieracium subpellucidum is a species of flowering plant belonging to the family Asteraceae.

Synonyms:
 Hieracium arcuatidens (Zahn) Üksip 
 Hieracium diaphanoides subsp. subpellucidum (Norrl.) Zahn 
 Hieracium uranopoleos Üksip
 Hieracium vulgatum subsp. arcuatidens Zahn

References

subpellucidum